James Cruze (born James Cruze Bosen; March 27, 1884 – August 3, 1942) was a silent film actor and film director.

Early years
 
Cruze's middle name came from the battle of Vera Cruz. He was raised in The Church of Jesus Christ of Latter-day Saints, but did not practice the religion after his teenage years. Very little is certain about his childhood and teen years because he told a different story at every interview he granted.

Career 
Cruze acted in, directed and or produced over 100 films, mainly during the silent era. His first known acting job was at Lubin Manufacturing Company in 1910. He started at Thanhouser Company in 1911 with She (1911), which is where the majority of his body of work was produced, much of it as the leading man.

After leaving Thanhouser in 1916, he worked for several other companies as director and producer, primarily for Paramount Pictures, from 1918 to 1938.

Cruze struggled to regain his successes of the silent era when sound came to film. His career declined as he descended further into alcoholism, and he ended his directing career at Republic Pictures. He spent the last four years of his life unemployed, before he killed himself in 1942.

Personal life 
Cruze was first married to actress Marguerite Snow, and they had a daughter, Julie Jane. They divorced in 1923. He married actress Betty Compson on October 14, 1924.

Filmography

As director
Partial list

 The Wrong Road (1937)
 Sutter's Gold (1936)
 Two-Fisted (1935)
 David Harum (1934)
 Helldorado (1934)
 Mr. Skitch (1933) with Will Rogers
 I Cover the Waterfront (1933) with Claudette Colbert
 Washington Merry-Go-Round (1932) with Lee Tracy
 If I Had a Million (1932) 8 directors; Cruze directed segment with Gene Raymond and Frances Dee
 Salvation Nell (1931) based on the play by Edward Sheldon
 Once a Gentleman (1930)
 The Great Gabbo (1929) with Erich von Stroheim and Betty Compson
 A Man's Man (1929) with William Haines
 The Duke Steps Out (1929)
 The Mating Call (1928) produced by Howard Hughes starring Thomas Meighan, Evelyn Brent, and Renée Adorée (Preserved by the Academy Film Archive, in conjunction with UNLV, in 2016.)
 The City Gone Wild (1927) with Louise Brooks—lost film
 Old Ironsides (1926) partly filmed in experimental widescreen process Magnascope
 Mannequin (1926) with Alice Joyce, Warner Baxter, Dolores Costello
 The Pony Express (1925)
 Beggar on Horseback (1925) based on the play by George S. Kaufman and Marc Connelly
 Welcome Home (1925) with Lois Wilson
 Merton of the Movies (1924) based on the novel by Harry Leon Wilson and the play by Kaufman and Connelly
 The Enemy Sex (1924)
 The Fighting Coward (1924) with Cullen Landis, Mary Astor
 The Covered Wagon (1923)
 Hollywood (1923) lost film
 To the Ladies (1923)
 One Glorious Day (1922) with Will Rogers
 The Dictator (1922) with Wallace Reid, Lila Lee
 Leap Year (1921) with Fatty Arbuckle
 Crazy to Marry (1921) with Arbuckle
 Gasoline Gus (1921) with Arbuckle
 The Dollar-a-Year Man (1921) with Arbuckle
 The Fast Freight (1921) with Arbuckle
 The Charm School (1921) with Wallace Reid
 Thirty Days (1922) with Reid and Hawley
 Food for Scandal (1920)
 An Adventure in Hearts (1919) with Robert Warwick
 Hawthorne of the U.S.A. (1919) with Reid
 The Valley of the Giants (1919) with Reid
 You're Fired (1919) with Reid and Wanda Hawley
 The Roaring Road (1919) with Reid
 The Dub (1919)

As actor

 The Last of the Mohicans (1911)
 The Covered Wagon (1923) (scenes deleted) .... Indian (Cruze was also director)
 The Slave Market (1921)
 Johnny Get Your Gun (1919) .... The Duke of Bullconia
 Under the Top (1919) .... 'Foxy' Stillmore
 The Source (1918) .... Langlois
 Less Than Kin (1918) .... Jinx
 The City of Dim Faces (1918) .... Wing Lung
 Believe Me, Xantippe (1918) .... Simp Calloway
 Wild Youth (1918) .... Li Choo
 The Hidden Pearls (1918) .... Koro Leon
 Nan of Music Mountain (1917) .... Gale Morgan
 The Call of the East (1917) .... Janzo
 On the Level (1917) .... Ozmun
 What Money Can't Buy (1917) .... Ferdinand Vaslof
 The Web of Life (1917) .... Tom Wilson
 Her Temptation (1917) .... Walton Maynard
 The Snowbird (1916) .... Bruce Mitchell
 Armstrong's Wife (1915) .... Harvey Arnold
 His Guardian Auto (1915)
 The Patriot and the Spy (1915) .... Pietro
 The Heart of the Princess Marsari (1915)
 Zudora (1914) .... Hassam Ali/Jim Baird, Reporter (film was retitled The Twenty Million Dollar Mystery)
 From Wash to Washington (1914)
 The Million Dollar Mystery (1914) .... Jim Norton
 Rivalry (1914) 
 A Dog of Flanders (1914)
 A Debut in the Secret Service (1914)
 The Cat's Paw (1914)
 The Desert Tribesman (1914)
 Cardinal Richelieu's Ward (1914) .... Richelieu
 A Leak in the Foreign Office (1914)
 Joseph in the Land of Egypt (1914) .... Joseph
 Why Reginald Reformed (1914)
 The Woman Pays (1914)
 The Adventures of a Diplomatic Freelance (1914)
 Frou Frou (1914) .... Comte Paul de Valreas
 The Legend of Provence (1913) .... Sir Henry
 The Silver-Tongued Orator (1913)
 The Plot Against the Governor (1913)
 A Daughter Worth While (1913)
 Moths (1913) .... Undetermined Name, villain
 Robin Hood (1913) (uncredited)
 The Message to Headquarters (1913)
 The Ward of the King (1913)
 An Unromantic Maiden (1913)
 Tannhäuser (1913)
 The Lost Combination (1913)
 The Snare of Fate (1913)
 Marble Heart (1913) .... Raphael
 Her Sister's Secret (1913)
 Rosie's Revenge (1913)
 The Woman Who Did Not Care (1913)
 Cymbeline (1913) .... Leonatus
 For Her Boy's Sake (1913)
 Her Gallant Knights (1913)
 The Idol of the Hour (1913)
 Good Morning, Judge (1913)
 The Dove in the Eagle's Nest (1913) .... The Eagle
 The Tiniest of Stars (1913) .... The Musician
 A Poor Relation (1913)
 When Ghost Meets Ghost (1913)
 A Militant Suffragette (1912) .... John Strong, Mary's Fiancé
 The Star of Bethlehem (1912) .... Micah, Joseph
 The Other Half (1912) .... The Father
 The Forest Rose (1912) .... Albert as an Older Man, Rose's Lover
 The Thunderbolt (1912) .... The Dishonest Broker
 Cross Your Heart (1912) .... The Little Boy Grown Up
 The Ladder of Life (1912)
 Put Yourself in His Place (1912) .... Edith's Husband
 In a Garden (1912) .... Jack, as an Adult
 The Woman in White (1912) .... Sir Percival
 When Mercy Tempers Justice (1912) .... The Impoverished Father
 Miss Robinson Crusoe (1912) .... Miss Crusoe's Rescuer and Lover
 Letters of a Lifetime (1912) .... A Dying Bachelor
 But the Greatest of These Is Charity (1912) .... The Rich Father
 Undine (1912) .... Huldbrand, the Knight
 Lucile (1912) .... Lord Alfred
 Baby Hands (1912) .... The Husband
 The Finger of Scorn (1912) .... The Minister
 Nursie and the Knight (1912) .... The Father
 Pa's Medicine (1912) .... The Doctor
 Under Two Flags (1912)
 Called Back (1912) .... Gilbert Vaughn
 Whom God Hath Joined (1912) .... The Husband
 The Ring of a Spanish Grandee (1912)
 Jess (1912) .... Captain John Neil
 Love's Miracle (1912) .... The Convict/Lover
 Miss Arabella Snaith (1912) .... Harry Hargreaves, Novelist
 The Cry of the Children (1912) .... The working father
 Rejuvenation (1912) .... The Millionaire
 Into the Desert (1912) .... The Arab
 A Love of Long Ago (1912)
 The Girl of the Grove (1912)
 For Sale—A Life (1912) .... The Wealthy Young Clubman
 he Golf Caddie's Dog (1912) .... The Lover
 Flying to Fortune (1912) .... The Daughter's Sweetheart
 The Arab's Bride (1912) .... The Wealthy Moor
 On Probation (1912)
 East Lynne (1912) .... Archibald Carlyle
 Dr. Jekyll and Mr. Hyde (1912) .... Dr. Jekyll / Mr. Hyde
 She (1911) .... Leo Vincey / Kallikrates
 Brother Bob's Baby (1911) .... Bob's Brother
 Beneath the Veil (1911) .... The Artist
 A Mother's Faith (1911) .... The Errant Son
 The Last of the Mohicans (1911) .... Uncas
 The Higher Law (1911)
 A Boy of the Revolution (1911)
 Back to Nature (1911)
 The Pied Piper of Hamelin (1911)

References

Bibliography
Ray Starman, "James Cruze: Cinema's Forgotten Director", Films In Review'' (October 1985), p. 460-465

External links

 

1884 births
1942 deaths
American male silent film actors
American male film actors
English-language film directors
German-language film directors
Artists from Ogden, Utah
Male actors from Utah
Burials at Hollywood Forever Cemetery
20th-century American male actors
Silent film directors
1942 suicides